Bang Kwang Central Prison is a men's prison in Nonthaburi Province, Thailand, on the Chao Phraya River about 11 km north of Bangkok. It is a part of the Department of Corrections.

Bang Kwang is the site of the men's death row and the execution chamber of Thailand.  the prison had about 6,000 inmates.

History
The prison houses many foreign prisoners. It is a harsh prison that handles death row and long-sentence prisoners. All prisoners are required to wear leg irons for the first three months of their sentences. Death row inmates were required to have their leg irons permanently welded on, although this practice ended in 2013. In the book The Damage Done, former prisoner and drug courier Warren Fellows recounts that the prison was nicknamed "Big Tiger" by the Thais because it "prowled and ate". Fellows's associate Paul Hayward also served part of his sentence there.

Death row
Bang Kwang contains Thailand's primary men's death row and execution chamber. Death rows for both men and women also are present in provincial prisons.
, 510 persons remained on death row nationwide.

 there was one man from the United Kingdom on death row at Bang Kwang, Alan John Davies. He was the first European to receive a death sentence in Thailand. He was freed after 17 years of "hell" in the Bang Kwang prison, returning to the UK in 2007 after being granted amnesty by the king.

Chaovaret Jarubon, the last executioner in Thailand to kill by gunfire, died in 2012, having executed 55 prisoners during his career. He wrote an autobiography in 2006, The Last Executioner, and co-wrote A Secret History of the Bangkok Hilton, with Pornchai Sereemongkonpol.

See also

Klong Prem Central Prison, Bangkok's other large maximum security prison used to hold foreign prisoners
Bangkok Hilton

References

External links
Short description at the Department of Corrections, Thailand (Archive)
Bangkwang.net, information about visiting Bangkwang prison
Checking Into The Bangkok Hilton: article in The Observer on visiting foreign prisoners
The Real Bangkok Hilton (BBC)

Capital punishment in Thailand
Prisons in Thailand
Buildings and structures in Nonthaburi province
Men's prisons